L. occidentalis may refer to:
 Leptochilus occidentalis, a wasp species in the genus Leptochilus
 Leptoglossus occidentalis, the western conifer seed bug, a true bug species native to California, Oregon and Nevada, United States
 Leptotyphlops occidentalis, the Western thread snake
 Linderiella occidentalis, the California fairy shrimp, a shrimp species native to California
 Lepisosteus occidentalis, a gar that lived from the late Cretaceous to Eocene.

See also 
 List of Latin and Greek words commonly used in systematic names#O